The 2013 Croatian Cup Final was a two-legged affair played between Hajduk Split and Lokomotiva. 
The first leg was played in Split on 8 May 2013, while the second leg on 22 May 2013 in Zagreb.

Hajduk Split won the trophy with an aggregate result of 5–4.

Road to the final

First leg

Second leg

References

External links
Official website 

2013 Final
HNK Hajduk Split matches
Cup Final